Tourville-les-Ifs is a commune in the Seine-Maritime department in the Normandy region in northern France.

Geography

Population

Places of interest
 The church of St. Martin, dating from the nineteenth century.
 The sixteenth-century chateau des Ifs.
 Traces of an eleventh-century castle.
 The sixteenth-century priory.

See also
Communes of the Seine-Maritime department

References

Communes of Seine-Maritime